"Shine" is a single by musician Mike Oldfield, released in 1986 (see 1986 in music). "Shine" features Jon Anderson on vocals.

Music video 
The music video for "Shine" features use of computer graphics, such as a computer generated game of chess. Oldfield plays a Gibson SG guitar in the video. The video is available on the Elements - The Best of Mike Oldfield DVD.

Track listing 
 "Shine" (Extended version) – 5:08
 "The Path" – 3:31

Charts 

1986 singles
Mike Oldfield songs
Virgin Records singles